Lorenzo Justiniano Parra Garcia  (born August 19, 1978) is a Venezuelan professional boxer who held the WBA flyweight title from 2003 to 2007. He has also challenged for the WBA Super bantamweight title in 2008 and the WBA bantamweight title in 2011.

Professional career

On December 6, 2003, Parra beat Eric Morel by a unanimous decision, for the WBA world championship title. Parra was stripped of his title in March 2007 after he failed to make weight for a bout with Takefumi Sakata, and went on to lose the fight anyway. As of 2018, Parra is still fighting and currently on a 13 fight Losing streak.

Professional boxing record

See also
List of flyweight boxing champions
List of Venezuelans

References

External links

1978 births
Living people
Light-flyweight boxers
Flyweight boxers
Bantamweight boxers
Super-bantamweight boxers
World flyweight boxing champions
World Boxing Association champions
People from Zulia
Venezuelan male boxers